XAA may refer to:

Science
Xaa, the abbreviation for an unspecified amino acid
Xaa-Pro aminopeptidase, an enzyme
Xaa-Xaa-Pro tripeptidyl-peptidase, an enzyme

Other uses
ISO 639:xaa, Andalusian Arabic
XFree86 Acceleration Architecture, an X Window System driver architecture